Jared Newson (born September 26, 1984 in Belleville, Illinois) is an American basketball player who played for the Sioux Falls Skyforce and Bakersfield Jam in the NBA D-League.

On October 25, 2014, Newson was inducted into the UT Martin Athletics Hall of Fame.

References

1984 births
Living people
American men's basketball players
BC Orchies players
Cairns Taipans players
HTV Basket players
UT Martin Skyhawks men's basketball players